Life expectancy has been rising rapidly and South Korea ranked 3rd in the world for life expectancy  (previously 11th in 2016). South Korea has among the lowest HIV/AIDS adult prevalence rate in the world, with just 0.1% of the population being infected, significantly lower than the U.S. at 0.6%, France's 0.4%, and the UK's 0.3% prevalence rate. South Korea has a good influenza vaccination rate, with a total of 43.5% of the population being vaccinated in 2019 (80.8% of people over 65). A new measure of expected human capital calculated for 195 countries from 1920 to 2016 and defined for each birth cohort as the expected years lived from age 20 to 64 years and adjusted for educational attainment, learning or education quality, and functional health status was published by the Lancet in September 2018. South Korea had the sixth highest level of expected human capital with 26 health, education, and learning-adjusted expected years lived between age 20 and 64 years. 

Obesity has been consistently among the world's lowest - only 3% of the population were obese, which was the second lowest in the OECD, compared to over 30% in the U.S. or 23% in the UK. As a result, mortality from cardiovascular disease was the fourth lowest in the OECD.

Health issues

Cancer
The cancer treatment in South Korea is regarded to be one of the best in the world with South Korea also having the highest cancer survival rate.

Suicide

Suicide in South Korea is a serious and widespread problem. The suicide rate was the highest in the OECD in 2012 (29.1 deaths per 100,000 people). Lithuania is ranked first, but is not an OECD member state as of September 2016.

Obesity

Smoking

In 2020, 16.4% of Koreans were noted to be daily smokers. According to the WHO in 2015, the age standardized prevalence of tobacco smoking in the Republic of South Korea is 49.8%. Starting on January 1, 2015, the Ministry of Health banned smoking in cafés, restaurants, and bars. Facilities, such as government offices, public institutions, public transport facilities and schools have become smoke-free zones. In 1986, the Republic of Korea mandated tobacco manufactures to include warnings on cigarette packages. The violation against the smoke policy include a fine, which is less than 100 thousand won.

Drinking alcohol

Alcohol consumption in Korea stood at 8.3L per person in 2020 (compared to 12.9L in Latvia and 1.3L in Turkey) according to the OECD. In 2018, the WHO noted that alcohol consumption distribution was 22.2% beer, 1.9% wine, 7.1% spirits, and 68.9% is attributed to "other.

Age-standardized death rate of liver cirrhosis for male in South Korea is 20.6% of which 70.5% is attributed to alcohol. Prevalence of alcohol use disorders (including alcohol dependence and harmful use of alcohol) is 10.3% of male in South Korea, more than twice of 4.6% of Western Pacific Region.

Infectious disease
An outbreak of Middle East respiratory syndrome (MERS) occurred in South Korea in May 2015 by a Korean who visited the Middle East and carried the MERS virus to Korea. Seven months later, the government officially declared that the outbreak was over.

Air pollution

According to the Environmental Performance Index 2016, South Korea ranked 173rd out of 180 countries in terms of air quality. More than 50 percent of the populations in South Korea exposed to dangerous levels of fine dust.

Tuberculosis
South Korea ranks last place among OECD countries for tuberculosis. Its three major indexes: incidence rate, prevalence rate and death rate are the worst among the OECD countries since 1996 when South Korea became a member of OECD.

Chronic disease
According to the Ministry of Health and Welfare, chronic illness account for the majority of diseases in South Korea, a condition exacerbated by the health care system’s focus on treatment rather than prevention. The incidence of chronic disease in South Korea hovers around 24 percent. The prevalence human immunodeficiency virus (HIV) 2015 was 14,880 cases. In 2001 central government expenditures on health care accounted for about 6 percent of gross domestic product (GDP). South Korea is experiencing a growing elderly population, which leads to an increase in chronic degenerative diseases. The proportion of the population over 65 is expected to rise from 13% in 2014 to 38% in 2050. Majority of health care professionals treat patients on curative, rather than preventive treatments, because of the lack of financial incentives for preventive treatments.

Unequal distribution of physicians
There are 2.5 doctors and 7.9 nurses per 1,000 people in South Korea (2020). There are regional disparities between urban and rural areas for health professionals. The number of primary care doctors in cities is 37.3% higher than in rural areas, and the problem is growing because younger physicians are choosing to practice in the cities.

See also
 Healthcare in South Korea
 Mental health in South Korea
 LGBT health in South Korea

References